Siak may refer to:

Asiagh (असियाग) (Siak (सियाक)), a gotra/clan of Jats found in India
Siunia Dynasty, alternatively known as Siak, a dynasty that ruled part of what is now Armenia
Eric Low Siak Meng (born 1948), Singaporean Chinese politician
Siak Regency, a regency of Riau, Sumatra, Indonesia
Siak River, a river in Sumatra, Indonesia
Sultanate of Siak Sri Indrapura a kingdom in Siak Regency from 1723 to 1946
PS Siak, a football club based in Siak Regency